Iroquois of St Regis Indian Reserve 59 is a First Nations reserve in Ontario. It is part of The St Regis Indian reserve, Mohawk Territory, which includes St Regis, Quebec (Indian Reserve) in Quebec and St. Regis Reservation, in New York. The Iroquois of St Regis (Akwesasne) are independent of the federal and provincial governments, this division is largely for statistical purposes.

References

Akwesasne
Mohawk reserves in Ontario